Sir Nigel Gresley's Canal was a  private canal between Apedale and Newcastle-under-Lyme both in Staffordshire, England.

History
The canal was used to transport coal from Sir Nigel Gresley's mines. It opened in 1776 after being approved by Act of Parliament in 1775. The act placed controls on the price at which coal transported via the canal to Newcastle could be sold for the following 42 years. The canal was transferred to the ownership of Robert Edensor Heathcote in 1827. It closed around 1857.

The canal joined the Newcastle-under-Lyme Junction Canal at a mill in Cross Heath, a site now occupied by a motorbike shop in Swift House on the A34 Liverpool Road. It then ran northwest to Milehouse, Chesterton and the Apedale mines. The Junction Canal was planned in turn to connect to the Newcastle-under-Lyme Canal via an inclined plane, but this was not built due to lack of money, thus the Sir Nigel Gresley's Canal remained severed from the main inland network and the Junction Canal became no more than an extension of the Gresley's Canal.

See also

Canals of the United Kingdom
History of the British canal system

Bibliography

References

External links
 "Tracing a canal via blackberries" - exploring the route in 2008

 

Newcastle-under-Lyme
Canals in Staffordshire
Canals opened in 1776